Louis of Lorraine (Louis Charles; 10 September 1725 – 28 June 1761) was a member of the House of Guise, a cadet branch of the House of Lorraine. He married three times and through his daughter, is an ancestor of the present House of Savoy. He was the Grand Squire of France and Governor of Anjou.

Early life

He was born as the fourth child and the first son of Louis de Lorraine, Prince of Lambesc and his wife, Jeanne Henriette Marguerite de Durfort (1691-1750), granddaughter of Jacques Henri de Durfort.

Military career

In December 1743, he was created the Grand Squire of France, a post which had been occupied by his distant cousin Charles de Lorraine. The post was one of the Great Officers of the Crown of France and a member of the King's Household. The position was roughly equivalent to the United Kingdom positions of Master of the Horse and the Crown Equerry.

Louis XV made him a Brigadier of the King's Armies in April 1745 and a knight of the Order of the Holy Spirit, the most prestigious knighthoods in France (21 May 1752).

Marriages and issue
On 31 January 1740 he married firstly Louise Charlotte de Gramont, Mademoiselle de Guiche (1725-1742), daughter of Antoine V de Gramont, Duke of Guiche. They didn't have children.

On 29 December 1744 he married for the second time. The bride was Auguste de Coëtquen (1722-1746), daughter of Jules Malo de Coëtquen, Marquis de Coëtquen, Count de Comburg. They didn't have children.

On 3 October 1748 he married his third wife, Princess Louise Julie Constance of Rohan (1734–1815), daughter of the Prince of Rochefort. They had:

Charles Eugène of Lorraine, Prince of Lambesc, Duke of Elbeuf (25 September 1751 – 11 November 1825) married two times, no issue;
Joséphine of Lorraine (26 August 1753 – 8 February 1797)
Anne Charlotte of Lorraine, Mademoiselle de Brionne (11 November 1755 – 22 May 1786) never married; reigning Princess-Abbess of Remiremont
Joseph of Lorraine, Prince of Vaudémont (23 June 1759 – 29 March 1812); married Louise Auguste Elisabeth Marie Colette de Montmorency-Logny (1763-1832). They didn't have children.

Ancestry

References and notes

French military personnel
1725 births
1761 deaths
House of Lorraine
18th-century French people
House of Guise
Grand Squires of France
Princes of Lorraine